This list of Russian historians includes the famous historians, as well as archaeologists, paleographers, genealogists and other representatives of auxiliary historical disciplines from the Russian Federation, the Soviet Union, the Russian Empire and other predecessor states of Russia.

Alphabetical list


A

Valery Alekseyev (1929-1991), anthropologist, proposed Homo rudolfensis
Mikhail Artamonov (1898-1972), historian and archaeologist, founder of modern Khazar studies, excavated a great number of Scythian and Khazar kurgans and settlements, including the fortress of Sarkel
Artemiy Artsikhovsky (1902-1978), archaeologist, discoverer of birch bark documents in Novgorod

B
Vasily Bartold (1869-1930), turkologist, the "Gibbon of Turkestan", an archaeologist of Samarcand
Konstantin Bestuzhev-Ryumin (1829-1897), 19th-century historian and paleographer, founder of the Bestuzhev Courses for women
Nikita Bichurin (1777-1853), a founder of Sinology, published many documents on Chinese and Mongolian history, opened the first Chinese-language school in Russia
Boris Hessen (1893-1936), physicist who brought externalism into modern historiography of science

D
Dmitry Ilovaysky (1832-1920), major 19th century anti-Normanist
Igor Diakonov (1915-1999), historian and linguist, a prominent researcher of Sumer and Assyria
Dimitri Obolensky (1918-2001), historian and Byzantinist

F
Boris Farmakovsky (1870-1928), archaeologist of Ancient Greek colony Olbia
Friedrich von Adelung (1768-1843), historian and museologist, researched the European accounts of the Time of Troubles

G

Vladimir Golenishchev (1856-1947), egyptologist, excavated Wadi Hammamat, discovered over 6,000 antiquities, including the Moscow Mathematical Papyrus, the Story of Wenamun, and various Fayum portraits
Timofey Granovsky (1813-1855), a founder of mediaeval studies in Russia, disproved the historicity of Vineta
Boris Grekov (1882-1953), prominent researcher of Kievan Rus' and Golden Horde
Alexander V. Gordon (born 1937), prominent researcher of French revolution, Third world and Peasantry
Vladimir Guerrier (1837-1919), historian of the French revolution, founder of the Courses Guerrier for women
Lev Gumilev (1912-1992), historian and ethnologist, prominent researcher of ancient Central Asian peoples, related ethnogenesis and biosphere, influenced the rise of Neo-Eurasianism

H

I
Igor Diakonov (1915-1999), historian and linguist, a prominent researcher of Sumer and Assyria

K 

Pyotr Kafarov (1817-1878), prominent sinologist, discovered many invaluable manuscripts, including The Secret History of the Mongols
Nikolai Karamzin (1766-1826), sentimentalist writer and historian, author of the 12-volume History of the Russian State, the principal early 19th-century account of national history
Vasily Klyuchevsky (1841-1911), dominated Russian historiography at the turn of the 20th century, shifted focus from politics and society to geography and economy
Alexander Kazhdan (1922-1997), Byzantinist, editor of the Oxford Dictionary of Byzantium
Nikodim Kondakov (1844-1925), prominent researcher of Byzantine art
Andrey Korotayev (born 1961), historian and anthropologist,  a founder of cliodynamics, a prominent developer of social cycle theory

Stanislaw Kuczera, (1928-2020), sinologist and archaeologist
Yelena Yefimovna Kuzmina (1931-2013), prominent researcher of prehistory of Indo-Aryan peoples

L
Platon Levshin (1737-1812), president of the Most Holy Synod during the Age of Enlightenment, author of the first systematic course of the history of Russian Orthodox Church
Nikolay Likhachyov (1862-1936), first and foremost Russian sigillographer, prominent also in a number of other auxiliary historical disciplines
Aleksey Lobanov-Rostovsky (1824-1896), statesman, published the major Russian Genealogical Book
Mikhail Lomonosov (1711-1765), polymath scientist and artist, the first opponent of the Normanist theory, published an early account of Russian history

M

Mikhail Artamonov (1898-1972), historian and archaeologist, founder of modern Khazar studies, excavated a great number of Scythian and Khazar kurgans and settlements, including the fortress of Sarkel
Mykola Kostomarov (1817-1885), historian, folklorist and romantic writer, researched the differences between Great Russia and Little Russia and the history of Ukraine
Pyotr Kozlov (1863-1935), explorer of Central Asia, discoverer of the ancient Tangut city of Khara-Khoto and Xiongnu royal burials at Noin-Ula

N
Nikolay Danilevsky (1822-1885), ethnologist, philosopher and historian, a founder of Eurasianism, the first to present an account of history as a series of distinct civilisations

M
Madhavan K. Palat (born 1947), since 1989 Professor of Russian and European History, Jawaharlal Nehru University, Delhi, India. Visiting Professor of Imperial Russian History at the University of Chicago (2006).
 Boris Marshak (1933-2006), excavated the Sogdian ruins at Panjakent
 Friedrich Martens (1845-1909), legal historian, drafted the Martens Clause of the Hague Peace Conference
 Vladimir Minorsky (1877-1966), prominent historian of Persia
 Yagutil Mishiev (born 1927), writer, author of books about the history of Derbent, Dagestan, Russia.
 Anatoly Moskvin (born 1966), linguist and historian, arrested in 2011 after the bodies of 26 mummified young women were discovered in his home.
 Gerhardt Friedrich Müller (1705-1783), co-founder of the Russian Academy of Sciences, explorer and the first academic historian of Siberia, a founder of ethnography, author of the first academic account of Russian history, put forth the Normanist theory
 Aleksei Musin-Pushkin (1744-1817), prominent collector of ancient Russian manuscripts, discovered The Tale of Igor's Campaign

O
Dimitri Obolensky (1918-2001), Byzantine commonwealth researcher
Alexey Okladnikov (1908-1981), prominent historian and archaeologist of Siberia and Mongolia
Sergey Oldenburg (1863-1934), a founder of Russian Indology and the Academic Institute of Oriental Studies
George Ostrogorsky (1902-1976), preeminent 20th century Byzantinist

P
Avraamy Palitsyn (died 1626), 17th-century historian of the Time of Troubles
Anna Pankratova (1897–1957), leading Soviet historian, educator and writer
Evgeny Pashukanis (1891-1937), legal historian, wrote The General Theory of Law and Marxism
Boris Piotrovsky (1908-1990), prominent researcher of Urartu, Scythia, and Nubia, long-term director of the Hermitage Museum
Mikhail Piotrovsky (born 1944), orientalist, current director of the Hermitage Museum
Mikhail Pogodin (1800-1875), leading mid-19th-century Russian historian, proponent of the Normanist theory
Boris Polevoy (1918-2002), major historian of the Russian Far East
Mikhail Pokrovsky (1868-1932), Marxist historian prominent in 1920s
Natalia Polosmak (born 1956), archaeologist of Pazyryk burials, discoverer of Ice Maiden mummy
Alexander Polovtsov (1832-1909), statesman, historian and Maecenas, founder of the Russian Historian Society
Tatyana Proskuryakova (1909-1985), Mayanist scholar and archaeologist, deciphered the ancient Maya script

R
Semyon Remezov (ca. 1642- after 1720), cartographer and the first historian of Siberia, author of the Remezov Chronicle
Mikhail Rostovtsev (1870-1952), archeologist and economist, the first to thoroughly examine the social and economic systems of the Ancient World, excavated Dura-Europos
Nicholas Roerich (1874-1947), painter, archeologist, and public figure, explorer of Central Asia, initiator of the international Roerich’s Pact on protection of historical monuments
Sergei Rudenko (1885-1969), discoverer of Scythian Pazyryk burials
Boris Rybakov (1908-2001), historian and chief Soviet archaeologist for 40 years, primary opponent of the Normanist theory

S
Dmitry Samokvasov (1843-1911), discoverer of Black Grave in Chernigov
Viktor Sarianidi (1929-2013), discoverer of the Bactria-Margiana Archaeological Complex and the Bactrian Gold in Central Asia
Mikhail Shcherbatov (1733-1790), a man of Russian Enlightenment, conservative historian
Anatoly Pavlovich Shikman (born 1948), author of Figures of Russian History and other works.
Sergey Solovyov (1820-1879), principal Russian 19th-century historian, author of the 29-volume History of Russia
Vasily Struve (1889-1965), orientalist and historian of the Ancient World, put forth the Marxist theory of five socio-economic formations that dominated the Soviet education

T
Yevgeny Tarle (1874-1955), author of the famous studies on Napoleon's invasion of Russia and on the Crimean War
Vasily Tatischev (1686-1750), statesman, geographer and historian, discovered and published Russkaya Pravda, Sudebnik of 1550 and the controversial Ioachim Chronicle, wrote the first full-scale account of Russian history
Mikhail Tikhomirov (1893-1965), leading specialist in medieval Russian paleography, published the Complete Collection of Russian Chronicles
Kamilla Trever (1892-1974), specialist in the history and culture of Transcaucasia and Central Asia
Boris Turayev (1868-1920), author of the first full-scale History of Ancient East
Peter Turchin (born 1957), population biologist and historian, coined the term cliodynamics

U
Fyodor Uspensky (1845-1928), Byzantinist, researcher of the Trapezuntine Empire
Aleksey Uvarov (1825-1884), founder of the first Russian archaeological society, discovered over 750 ancient kurgans

V
Vasily Vasilievsky (1838-1899), prominent 19th century Byzantinist
Alexander Vasiliev (1867-1953), author of a comprehensive History of the Byzantine Empire
Nikolay Veselovsky (1848-1918), first to excavate Afrasiab (the oldest part of Samarkand), as well as the Solokha and Maikop kurgans in Southern Russia
Viacheslav Petrovich Volgin, (1879–1962), historian of early communist systems

Y
Nikolai Yadrintsev (1842-1894), discoverer of Genghis Khan's capital Karakorum and the Orkhon script of ancient Türks
Valentin Yanin (1929-2020), primary researcher of ancient birch bark documents

Z
Gennady Zdanovich (born 1938), discoverer of Sintashta culture settlement Arkaim
Viktor Zemskov (1946-2015), researcher of political repression in the Soviet Union between 1917 and 1954

See also

List of linguists
List of Russian scientists
Russian history
Russian archaeology
Science and technology in Russia

Further reading

 Baron, Samuel H., and Nancy W. Heer. "The Soviet Union: Historiography Since Stalin." in Georg G. Iggers and Harold Talbot Parker, eds. International handbook of historical studies: contemporary research and theory (Taylor & Francis, 1979). pp 281–94.
 
Confino, Michael. "The New Russian Historiography and the Old—Some Considerations," History & Memory (2009) 21#2  in Project MUSE
David-Fox, Michael et al. eds. After the Fall: Essays in Russian and Soviet Historiography (Bloomington: Slavica Publishers, 2004)
 Eissenstat, Bernard W. "MN Pokrovsky and Soviet Historiography: Some Reconsiderations." Slavic Review 28.4 (1969): 604–618.
 Enteen, George M. The Soviet Scholar-Bureaucrat: MN Pokrovskii and the Society of Marxist Historians (Penn State Press, 1978).
 Kuzio, Taras. "Historiography and national identity among the Eastern Slavs: towards a new framework." National Identities 3.2 (2001): 109–132. online
 Sanders, Thomas, ed. Historiography of Imperial Russia: The Profession and Writing of History in a Multinational State (1999).
 Tillett, Lowell. The great friendship: Soviet historians on the non-Russian nationalities (U of North Carolina Press, 1969).
 Topolski, Jerzy. "Soviet Studies and Social History" in Georg G. Iggers and Harold Talbot Parker, eds. International handbook of historical studies: contemporary research and theory (Taylor & Francis, 1979. pp 295–300..

 
Historians
Russian
Historians
Russian literature-related lists